Fukaya (written: 深谷) is a Japanese surname. Notable people with the surname include:

, Japanese mathematician
Michiyo Fukaya (1953–1987), American poet and activist
, Japanese politician
, Japanese footballer

Japanese-language surnames